Subarayar Vembu (19 March 1928 – 1 December 2015), better known by the pseudonym of Vikiraman, was an Indian novelist, short story writer and a journalist who wrote in Tamil. He was also a writer of children's literature.

Biography 
He was born to Subarayar and Lashmiammal. His father was an employee of Southern Railways during British rule and was one of the surveyors who was responsible for the construction of the Pamban Bridge. His father also worked for Sudeshamitran, a Tamil daily under the editorship of Bharathiyaar.

Early years 
He was always interested in journalism, especially handwritten magazines in his school days. In his high school, he started publishing a magazine called Tamil Chudar which was acclaimed by Kalki Krishnamurthy, Rajaji and A.K. Gopal Chettiyar.

He has travelled extensively to places like Malaysia, Singapore, Sri Lanka, Paris, Dubai, Rome and places of historical significance in India.

Journalism 
He worked for a weekly magazine called Velli Mani from 1946–1947, for Tamizh Pannai in 1948.  He edited arguably the longest surviving Tamil literary monthly magazine, Amudasurabhi, for over five decades (1951–2003). He started a fortnightly Tamil literary magazine Illakiyapeedam in 1997 and is its editor and publisher.
He was also the editor of the following magazines: Kuruvi (children's weekly), Sundari (fortnightly), Mangalam (weekly) and Tamil Arasi (weekly).

Works 
Vikiraman is known more for his novels, particularly historical novels, than for his short stories. He edited arguably the longest surviving Tamil literary magazine, Amudasurabhi, for well over five decades (1949–2002). He is perhaps the only Tamil writer who has tried his hand in almost every genre, in addition to novel and short story, drama, poetry, travelogue and essay. He has also written stories for children and books on history for the youth in simple Tamil.

His first historical novel, Udayachandran, appeared in 1957 and he has added 33 more in the four succeeding decades. The most famous of these has been Nandipurathu Nayagi, first serialised in Amudasurabi during 1957–59, and published in book form in 1964. Nandipurathu Nayagi is in fact a sequel to Ponniyin Selvan of his better-known contemporary and mentor, Kalki Krishnamurthy, whose influence on Vikiraman is quite significant in respect of both historical novels and short stories.

With more than 150 short stories in 62 years to his credit, Vikiraman continues to write fiction for Ilakkiya Peetam, which he presently edits. Although he has received many accolades including the Kalaimamani title from the Tamil Nadu Government and an award from Tamil University, Thanjavur, for his literary achievements, he has admittedly a grievance that he is known only as a novelist and journalist, and not as a short story writer among the Tamil readers. And hence this collection of his 70 short stories, as he reveals his mind in Kathaiyin Kathai, a sort of preface to the volume. Not an unjust grievance anyway, in this fast-track cultural ambience in which literature is loved more for its entertainment value, forcing the long, time-consuming novel to yield ground to short story as a form of literary expression. Judged from J.B. Priestley's observation that "at its best, the short story offers us a wonderfully clear little window through which we can see something of the lights and shadows, the heights and depths of life in this world," a substantial number of the stories in this collection pass the test.

Bibliography

Children's book 
Tanneer Pappa (1946)

Historical novels

Pallava Period 
Udhayachandiran
Kanchisundari
Kadalmallai Kaadhali
Kovoor Koonan
Parivadini
Manikkaveenai

Pandya Period 
Pandyan Mahudam
Pagaivanin Kaadhali
Kanni Kottai Elavarasi

Chola Period 
Nandhipuraththu Nayagi
Kulottungan Sabadam
Chittiravalli
Maravarman Kaadhali
Rajadittan Sabadam
Thyagavallabhan
Yaazhnangai
Chola Elavarasan Kanavu
Therkku Vaasal Mohini
Kondrai Malar Kumari
Chola Mahudam
Mangala Devan Magal
Oruvaal Orumahudam Iruvizhikkal
Vanjeenagar Vanjee
Vandiya Devan Vaal
Rajarajan Sabadam
Gangapuri Kaavalan
Paraandagan Magal

Social novels

Historical 
Naachiyaar Magal
Ratnahaaram

General 
Idhayapeedam
Thituvilakku
Gandhimadiyin Kanavan
Azhagu Raani
Nalla Manidargal
Chandiramadi

Short story collections 
Vikiraman Sirukadhaigal
Ponnvizha Aandu Sirukadhai KALANJIYAM (51 stories)
Azhagin Niram Amaithi
Kuzhal Osai
Somadevarin Uzhil
Thanga Vigraham
Kadamaiyum Kadaivizhiyum
Oh! Mudhaliya Sirukadaigal
Sanghu Devan Punarjanmam
Pavazha Vizha Aandu Sirukadhai KALANJIYAM (70 stories)
Swarna Kili (novella)
Abhimaana Valli (historical short stories)

Books for youth 
Porkaalathin Kadhai
Kaanchi Kaavalar Kadhai

Travelogues 
Vatapi Vijayam
Mammalapuram (1947)
Sirrpam Chittiram Gopuram Kovil

English books 
Telugu Kings in Tamil Nadu

Plays 
Sollkaatu Sedhupadi
Parivadhini (dramatised)
Idhayapeedam (dramatised)
Nimmadhi (televised)

Biographies 
Mahaatmavin Paadhai
Yeppo Varuvaro?

Edited collections 
Pannmugha Paarvaiyil Bharathiyin Padaippukal

Autobiography 
Marakka Mudiyaadhvarkal
Ninaithu Paarkkiren Part 1&2

Honours 
1981 Tamil Nadu State Tamil Development Department Award for 'Chola Elavarasan Kanavu'
Raja Sir Annamalai Chettiyaar award by MAC Trust for the novel 'Madhurai Mahudam'
Honorary Doctorate in Tamil Literature by World University
1988 Tamizh Annai Virudu by Thanjavur Tamil University
1991 Kalaimaamani by Tamil Nadu Government
Kapila Vaannar Virudu by Thirukoviloor Cultural Association
Narkkadai Nambi award by Kundrakkudiadikal
Centurion Trust Award by Chennai Cosmopolitan Club
Vaagai Chemmal Award by Salem Tamil Sangam
Bharathiyaar Virudu by Chennai Bharathiyaar Sangam
He has been bestowed with the titles of 'Charitra Kadhai Chemmal', 'Muttamizh Vittagar', 'Pannpattu Kaavalar', 'Sirukadhai Sekkiyaar', ' Kadhai Kalai Chemmal', 'Aruntamizh Maamani', 'Maamnidar' etc. by various cultural associations

Social services/posts Held 
President, All India Tamil Writer's Association
Trustee, Tamil Writer's Well Being Trust
Chief Patron, Bharathiyaar Annual Festival at Ettayapuram
Government representative to Eyal Isai Nataka Manram
Twice member of Censor Board of Film Certification (Chennai Region)

References 
 The Hindu. 13 September 2009.

Tamil-language writers
20th-century Indian short story writers
1928 births
2015 deaths
Indian historical novelists
20th-century Indian novelists
Indian children's writers
Children's writers in Tamil
20th-century Indian dramatists and playwrights
Novelists from Tamil Nadu
Journalists from Tamil Nadu